Buxerolles is a commune in the Vienne department, Nouvelle-Aquitaine, western France. It is a northern suburb of Poitiers.

Population

See also
Communes of the Vienne department

References

Communes of Vienne